Black and White is a 2009 book written by Jackie Kessler and Caitlin Kittredge and published by Spectra Trade Paperbacks.  The book is a superhero novel, similar to Soon I Will Be Invincible.  It is the first book in the Icarus Project series. The second book, Shades of Gray, was released in June 2010.

Plot 
Two super powered women who were once friends end up on opposite sides of the law.  The two battle each other while trying to get to the truth and help make the world better.

From the back of the book:  They were best friends at an elite academy for superheroes in training, but now Callie Bradford, code name Iridium, and Joannie Greene, code name Jet, are mortal enemies.  Jet is a by-the-book hero using her Shadow power to protect the citizens of New Chicago.  Iridium, with her mastery of light, runs the city's underworld.  For the Past Five Years the two have played an elaborate, and frustrating, game of Cat and Mouse.

But now playtime's over.  Separately Jet and Iridium uncover clues that point to a looming evil, one that is entwined within the Academy.  As Jet works with Bruce Hunter-a normal man with an extraordinary ability to make her weak in the knees-she becomes convinced that Iridium is involved in a scheme that will level the power structure of America itself.  And Iridium, teaming with the mysterious vigilante called Taser, uncovers an insidious plot that's been a decade in the making...a plot in which Jet is key.

Synopsis 

The main story takes place in 2112 with five sections covering earlier events, starting ten years ago, and moving up to as five, with each year covering one of the school years at the academy.  Iridium and Jet are two new students starting their first year at the academy, both having events in their past and being assigned to roommates together.  The two eventually become friends, making enemies with Hornblower and Dawnlighter, and friends with Frostbite, Samson, and some of the other students.  Jet especially develops more of a close relationship with one of their teachers, Night, and becomes enemies with another, Lancer.  Later on the two are assigned as partners to each other to work together.

When Jet's boyfriend Samson is killed by The Everyman Society on what was supposed to be a safe training exercise, the two start to drift apart as Jet gains early sponsorship from New Chicago for her funeral speech and immerses herself in her school work.  The two finally start to patch things up when Jet is sent to talk to Iridium who is upset because Frostbite has been sent to therapy for being in a homosexual relationship.

During their final exam, where the teams have to collect gang flags from certain points through a town, Iridium falls from the vehicle and Jet is ordered back to fill the report in person.  As Iridium starts to walk toward a place she can get back to the academy from, she comes across a rapist attacking a prostitute who is off duty and refusing.  Iridium interrupts, letting the prostitute escape, and is attacked by the rapist, whom she kills, then turns the body over to the police.

After Iridium's actions, it is decided that the young woman will be sent to therapy.  Jet, hearing this, fears for what it will do to her friend and does not think she will survive it.  She stops the people and makes a deal, having Iridium sent to Blackbird penetentary instead.  Just before the transfer, Jet sneaks in to talk to Iridium, who attacks her friend, feeling Jet betrayed the friendship, and escapes.  Iridium is labeled as a Rabid as she disappears, working toward her own goals in a section of New Chicago called Wrecked City.  Jet graduates, becoming the official superhero of New Chicago.

Five years later, Iridium is spotted after robbing a bank, and Jet goes after her.  The two fight, ending in Iridium escaping with the money.  Jet ends up fighting a street gang when her new runner, Bruce Hunter, arrives.  Jet finds herself attracted to him and scolds herself some for thinking like that.  After an embarrassing appearance on the Jack Goldwater show, Night contacts Jet and asks her to look for Lynda Kidder, as a favor, implies that Corp-Co may not want the reporter found, which Jet has a hard time believing.

After dealing with a local gangster who is not playing by her rules, Iridium meets with the leader of a gang called the Undergoths and learns of a vigilante working in her area who she confronts.  After fighting, she ends up concluding to partner with him as he seems to be of use in her plan to take down the Ops computer system.

As Jet is led down into the underground to find Lynda Kidder, Iridium and the vigilante, Taser, enter the underground to find access to the building where the blueprints of The Academy would be kept.  The pair come across Jet fighting Lynda who had been turned into a heavily muscled monster with a simple mind.  After defeating the monstrous Lynda, Jet attacks Iridium, believing that the former friend was somehow involved in what had happened to the reporter.  Iridium tries to talk sense into Jet, who won't listen, then ends up knocking the hero out and getting away.

Jet is shortly found by Bruce and taken to a hospital.  Her injuries are healed rapidly by a faith healer, but she is forced to spend two weeks having bed rest.  A prospect she does not fully enjoy.  Two days before she would be cleared, Jet is caught by Bruce at the window after stopping a purse snatching, and the two end up sleeping together.  Jet tries to tell Night the truth about Iridium not being involved in what happened to Lynda, but the former mentor will not listen, and mentions that Corp-Co has a deal with the Everyman Society.  Jet ends up realizing that somehow, Corp-Co has managed to brainwash her some without her knowing.

After warning a friend of hers, Iridium, along with Taser, shuts down the back up power, then head to the headquarters for the superheroes.  The two shut off the power, then head up to the Academy, working through until they reach Ops.  They look at the computer for a moment, noticing a strange signal that's always broadcasting, they shut down Ops and destroy the computer.  When they finish, Taser knocks out Iridium.

In her apartment, Jet worries when Bruce is late, then dons her costume.  The power goes out and the heroine ends up being attacked by Taser, who sedates her.

Jet wakes up in a small area with power inhibiting bonds next to Iridium.  The two argue a moment before finally starting to talk and begin patching things up between them again.  Iridium tells Jet her plan, who in turns tell about the brainwashing, which Iridium realizes is what the frequency on the Ops computer was sending through all the superhero ear pieces all along.

After the two speak and start working things out, Taser enters, revealing that he is a mercenary who was hired to get close to them both, as well as that he is Bruce Hunter, much to Jet's shock and sadness.  It turns out that Taser had been working for Night, who had been planning for years to have Jet blanket the world in absolute darkness.  He had tried to have Iridium killed but when it did not work, Night has Jet draw the light power from Iridium to create shadows that will block out the sun.  Taser overhears the plan and is not happy about the matter, attacking Night.  Eventually Jet is stopped from draining Iridium, freed from the machine and Night is defeated.  In a moment of insanity, Jet tries to kill Taser, but Iridium manages to stop her.

The two leave, going their own ways some.  Jet tells of the brainwashing to one of the other extrahumans, who works at ops and reports that when the computer went down, only three heroes stayed heroes, with the rest either turning rabid or just standing around.  Iridium meanwhile is back her the area she has claimed as her own and believes that soon Jet will join their side.

Characters 

Jet: Real name Joannie Greene.  Named after the gemstone jet.  At a young age, her father was driven insane by his shadow powers, killing Jet's mother with his power and going after the child for breaking the rules and sneaking cookies before dinner.  Her father is stopped before getting to her, but the event left Joannie with a fear, becoming very obsessed with rules and regulations and also following and maintaining such things.  Joanie eventually manifested the power of shadow herself, and in so doing started to hear voices coming from the shadows.  The two events have left her afraid of the dark, tending to leave all the lights on around her home, even when she sleeps, and keeps background noise going to keep from hearing the voices.

Iridium: Real name Callie Bradford. Named after iridium.  Her mother left at some point and her father was once a hero who turned rabid.  Manifesting the power to manipulate and control light, and through it heat as well, Callie was eventually sent to the academy and roomed with Jet.  Although tending to come across as mean to most of the other students, Iridium felt the urge help Jet, protecting the shy quiet girl from others and helping her socialize some.  Iridium herself was disliked by most because of her anti-social tendencies and the fact her father had changed sides and was now a criminal.  Iridium has a tendency to ignore procedure, doing things her own way.  This culminated in the fifth year final when she fell from the ship during the test, which led to her confronting and killing a rapist, which she felt no guilt after.  Feeling betrayed by Jet who had Iridium sentenced to going to Blackbird instead of being sent to Therapy, the two fought quickly, after which Iridium escaped.  While Jet became the official hero of New Chicago, Iridium was marked as a rabid herself.  Since her escape, she has been fighting crime in her own way in what is locally known as Wreck City, allowing some criminal activity to occur within limits herself, and even committing some as well.  Iridium also intends to take down Corp-co itself, revealing the truth about it to the world.

Taser:  Real name Bruce Hunter.  Named after a taser due to his power to unleash electrical energy.  Taser is a licensed mercenary hired to get close to both Jet and Iridium.  As Bruce Hunter, he becomes Jet's new official Runner.  Using small bits of his power, he sends electricity to pulse through her body to arouse the hero and make her believe she is attracted to him. As Taser, he poses as a vigilante who dislikes Corp-co, and begins to fight criminal activities in the area Iridium has claimed as her own. Knocking both out in the same night, he takes them to the location chosen by the person who hired them, and reveals the truth to both, much to Jet's heartbreak. When he finds out that the two were being used to black out the sun, he turns on his former employer. When Iridium and Jet are freed, Jet, being manipulated by shadows and angry at him, tries to kill Taser. Being saved by Iridium, he lets the two escape while calling the police to report an altered version of events.

References

2009 American novels
Superhero novels
2009 science fiction novels
American science fiction novels
Novels set in the 22nd century